Benajuy-ye Gharbi Rural District is in the Central District of Bonab County, East Azerbaijan province, Iran. At the census of 2006, its population was 25,612 in 6,267 households; there were 26,062 inhabitants in 7,377 households at the following census of 2011; and in the most recent census of 2016, the population of the rural district was 27,066 in 8,281 households. The largest of its 14 villages was Qarah Chopoq, with 5,456 people.

References 

Bonab County

Rural Districts of East Azerbaijan Province

Populated places in East Azerbaijan Province

Populated places in Bonab County